Jayawijaya Regency is one of the regencies (kabupaten) in the Indonesian province of Highland Papua. It occupies an area of 13,925.31 km2 in the Baliem Valley, situated in the central highlands of the province. It had a population of 196,085 at the 2010 Census, and 269,553 at the 2020 Census.  Its capital is Wamena.

Administrative districts

In 2010 the Jayawijaya Regency comprised eleven districts (distrik), listed below with their populations at the 2010 Census. Since 2010, the number of districts has been raised to forty by the splitting of existing districts, and these are all shown below with their area and their population at the 2020 Census. The table also includes the location of the district administrative centres, the number of administrative villages (rural desa and urban kelurahan) in each district and its post code.

Note that those districts with 2010 populations given in the 2010 Population column were the eleven districts extent in 2010; the remaining twenty-nine districts with no figure given in the 2010 Population column were those created from the original eleven districts subsequent to 2010.

References

External links
Statistics publications from Statistics Indonesia (BPS)

Regencies of Highland Papua